Klaus Moesgaard Andersen  (born 13 February 1997) is a Danish footballer who plays for Denmark Series club Ringkøbing IF.

Career

Esbjerg fB
Moesgaard started playing football at the age of 13 at Skjern GF, before joining Esbjerg fB in 2014 at the age of 17. Moesgaard had played for the first senior team of Skjern GF at the age of 17 and helped the club with promotion, scoring 16 goals in 13 games in the 2013–14 season. The transfer to Esbjerg was set up by a person who worked for Skjern, that had a contact in Esbjerg fB and through his contact arranged a trial, which went well. He started playing with the U19's and in the summer of 2016, he signed a youth contract. Moesgaard played several friendly games with the first team in the summer of 2016, and also began to train with the first team three times a week.

In April 2017, Moesgaard signed a contract extension despite being injured for the remainder of 2017. He was also promoted to the first team squad. He returned from injury in November 2018 and made his debut in the Danish Cup against fellow Superliga outfit SønderjyskE on 7 November 2018 appearing as a substitute in a 2–1 quarter final win.

Moesgaard left the club at the end of the 2018–19 season.

Ringkøbing IF
On 30 July 2019, Danish 2nd Division club Ringkøbing IF announced that they had signed Moesgaard.

References

External links

Danish men's footballers
Association football wingers
1997 births
Living people
Esbjerg fB players
Ringkøbing IF players
Danish 2nd Division players
Denmark Series players
People from Ringkøbing-Skjern Municipality
Sportspeople from the Central Denmark Region